Xerocrassa langloisiana is a species of air-breathing land snail, a pulmonate gastropod mollusk in the family Geomitridae.

Distribution
This species is native to Palestine, Israel and Jordan.

References

External links
 Bourguignat, J.-R. (1853). Catalogue raisonné des mollusques terrestres et fluviatiles recueillis par M. F. de Saulcy pendant son voyage en Orient. In: F. de Saulcy, Voyage autour de la Mer Morte et dans les terres bibliques exécuté de décembre 1850 à avril 1851, Livr. 15. XXVI + 96 pp., pls 1-4
 Mousson, A. (1861). Coquilles terrestres et fluviatiles recueillies par M. le Prof. J.R. Roth dans son dernier voyage en Orient. Vierteljahrsschrift der Naturforschenden Gesellschaft in Zürich, 6 (1): 1-34; 6 (2): 124-156. Zürich
 Westerlund, C. A. (1889). Fauna der in der paläarctischen Region (Europa, Kaukasien, Sibirien, Turan, Persien, Kurdistan, Armenien, Mesopotamien, Kleinasien, Syrien, Arabien, Egypten, Tripolis, Tunesien, Algerien und Marocco) lebenden Binnenconchylien. II. Gen. Helix. Berlin: R. Friedländer. pp. 473 + 31 (Register)
 Neubert, E.; Amr, Z. S.; Waitzbauer, W.; Al Talafha, H. (2015). Annotated checklist of the terrestrial gastropods of Jordan (Mollusca: Gastropoda). Archiv für Molluskenkunde. 144(2): 169-238

langloisiana
Fauna of the Middle East
Invertebrates of Israel
Fauna of Jordan
Flora of Palestine (region)
Gastropods described in 1853